Toxey Daniel Haas III (born January 21, 1960) is an American entrepreneur and conservationist. In 1986, he founded Haas Outdoors, Inc. where he currently serves as CEO.

Early life and education
Haas was born and raised in West Point, Mississippi where he attended Oak Hill Academy. His father Fox took him hunting at Choctaw Bluff, a hunting club near Mobile, Alabama. A tree at their favorite hunting spot known as the Mossy Oak tree would serve as key inspiration in Haas' business career. After graduating in 1976, he continued his education at Mississippi State University. While at Mississippi State, he was a member of Sigma Chi fraternity and attained his bachelor's degree in Business Administration.

Haas married Diane Lusk, and they moved back to West Point. He began working for Bryan Foods, a division of Sara Lee.

Career
Haas had an idea to improve the conventional camouflage that hunters used. Haas gained inspiration from leaves, twigs, and dirt and pursued his first camouflage pattern. After being turned down many times, Crystal Springs Print Works in Georgia agreed to print his pattern. However, they had a 10,000 yard minimum, and he could only afford 800 yards. Haas convinced them to make an exception.

Haas officially left his job at Bryan for his entrepreneurial pursuits and enlisted the help of his friend Bill Sugg as his partner. In 1986, Toxey Haas founded Mossy Oak Brand Camouflage and its parent company Haas Outdoors, Inc. The first Mossy Oak clothing was sewn by Haas' mother in his childhood home.

Haas and his friend Chris Hawley cofounded Mossy Oak's real estate company Mossy Oak Properties in 1999.

Haas, along with wildlife biologist Grant Woods, cofounded BioLogic in 1999. BioLogic is headquartered in West Point. Founded in 2007, Nativ Nurseries is headquartered in West Point and grows and sells trees for landowners.

Awards and recognition
Mississippi Small Business Person of the Year (1989)
West Point Hall of Fame (1999)
Catch-A-Dream "Corporate Vision Award" (2004)
Legends of the Outdoors Hall of Fame (2009)
Ducks Unlimited Hero of Conservation (2009)
Mississippi State University College of Business Alumnus of the Year (2017)
National Wild Turkey Federation Lifetime Achievement Conservation Award (2022)

Appearances in literature
Chapters of the following books regard Haas' endeavors:
 Storms of Perfection, Andy Andrews
 Mississippians, Neil White
 Mississippi Entrepreneurs, Polly Dement
 What No One Ever Tells You about Starting Your Own Business: Real-Life Start-Up Advice from 101 Successful Entrepreneurs, Jan Norman

References

1960 births
Living people
American conservationists
American retail chief executives
Businesspeople from Mississippi
Mississippi State University alumni
People from West Point, Mississippi